Benjamin Krause (born 15 November 1982) is a German international rugby union player, playing for the DSV 78 Hannover in the Rugby-Bundesliga and the German national rugby union team.

He plays rugby since 1993. He made his debut for Germany in a game against a Welsh development side on 24 February 2007.

His club, DSV 78/08 Ricklingen, won the 2nd Bundesliga title in 2008-09 and earned promotion to the Rugby-Bundesliga, now playing as DSV 78 Hannover.

Krause has also played for the Germany's 7's side in the past, like at the 2008 Hannover Sevens.

Honours

National team
 European Nations Cup - Division 2
 Champions: 2008

Stats
Benjamin Krause's personal statistics in club and international rugby:

Club

 As of 4 December 2013

National team

European Nations Cup

Friendlies & other competitions

 As of 4 December 2013

References

External links
 Benjamin Krause at scrum.com
  Benjamin Krause at totalrugby.com
  Benjamin Krause at the DRV website

1982 births
Living people
German rugby union players
Germany international rugby union players
DSV 78 Hannover players
Rugby union props